An abnormal end or abend is an abnormal termination of software, or a program crash.

This usage derives from an error message from the IBM OS/360, IBM zOS operating systems. Usually capitalized, but may appear as "abend". Some common ABEND codes are ABEND 0C7 (data exception) and ABEND 0CB (division by zero). Abends can be "soft" (allowing automatic recovery) or "hard" (terminating the activity).

Errors or crashes on the Novell NetWare network operating system are usually called ABENDs. Communities of NetWare administrators sprung up around the Internet, such as abend.org.

The term is jocularly claimed to be derived from the German word "abend" meaning "evening".

See also
 Abort
 Exit status
 Fatal exception error

References

Further reading 
 

Computer errors
Software anomalies
IBM mainframe operating systems
Computing terminology